Moran is a city in Allen County, Kansas, United States.  As of the 2020 census, the population of the city was 466.

History
Moran had its start in the year 1881 by the building of the Saint Louis, Fort Scott, and Wichita Railroad (later known as the Wichita & Western Division of the Missouri Pacific Railroad) through that territory. The Kansas City Pacific (later known as the Kansas City subdivision of the Missouri-Kansas-Texas Railroad built through the town. The community was originally called Morantown.

Geography
Moran is located at  (37.916168, -95.170718).

Climate
The climate in this area is characterized by hot, humid summers and generally mild to cool winters.  According to the Köppen Climate Classification system, Moran has a humid subtropical climate, abbreviated "Cfa" on climate maps.

Demographics

2010 census
As of the census of 2010, there were 558 people, 219 households, and 142 families living in the city. The racial makeup of the city was 93.7% White, 2.0% African American, 1.3% Native American, 0.2% Pacific Islander, 0.2% from other races, and 2.7% from two or more races. Hispanic or Latino of any race were 1.1% of the population.

There were 219 households, of which 34.2% had children under the age of 18 living with them, 43.4% were married couples living together, 10.5% had a female householder with no husband present, 11.0% had a male householder with no wife present, and 35.2% were non-families. 28.8% of all households were made up of individuals, and 14.6% had someone living alone who was 65 years of age or older. The average household size was 2.36 and the average family size was 2.75.

The median age in the city was 45.4 years. 23.7% of residents were under the age of 18; 7.1% were between the ages of 18 and 24; 18.5% were from 25 to 44; 28.9% were from 45 to 64; and 21.9% were 65 years of age or older. The gender makeup of the city was 45.7% male and 54.3% female.

2000 census
As of the census of 2000, there were 562 people, 224 households, and 140 families living in the city. The racial makeup of the city was 96.44% White, 0.36% African American, 1.96% Native American, and 1.25% from two or more races. Hispanic or Latino of any race were 0.36% of the population.

There were 224 households, out of which 28.6% had children under the age of 18 living with them, 48.7% were married couples living together, 9.4% had a female householder with no husband present, and 37.5% were non-families. 31.3% of all households were made up of individuals, and 19.6% had someone living alone who was 65 years of age or older. The average household size was 2.34 and the average family size was 2.99.

In the city, the population was spread out, with 24.7% under the age of 18, 7.7% from 18 to 24, 21.9% from 25 to 44, 20.5% from 45 to 64, and 25.3% who were 65 years of age or older. The median age was 42 years. For every 100 females, there were 90.5 males. For every 100 females age 18 and over, there were 80.8 males.

The median income for a household in the city was $30,179, and the median income for a family was $37,750. Males had a median income of $25,729 versus $19,028 for females. The per capita income for the city was $14,080. About 8.7% of families and 13.1% of the population were below the poverty line, including 6.7% of those under age 18 and 25.3% of those age 65 or over.

Education
Moran is a part of Marmaton Valley USD 256 public school district. The district high school is Marmaton Valley High School located in Moran. Marmaton Valley High School mascot is Wildcats.

Notable person
 Debra Dene Barnes, 1968 Miss America

References

Further reading

External links
 City of Moran
 Moran - Directory of Public Officials
 USD 256, local school district
 Moran city map, KDOT

Cities in Kansas
Cities in Allen County, Kansas
1881 establishments in Kansas
Populated places established in 1881